John XIII (? – after 1320) was the Ecumenical Patriarch of Constantinople from 1315 to 1320.

14th-century patriarchs of Constantinople